Washington Township is a township in Nodaway County, in the U.S. state of Missouri.

Washington Township was named after President George Washington.

References

Townships in Missouri
Townships in Nodaway County, Missouri